Bonaventura is an at-grade light rail station located in the center median of First Street at its intersection with Bonaventura Drive, after which the station is named, in San Jose, California. The station is owned by Santa Clara Valley Transportation Authority (VTA) and is served by the Blue Line and the Green Line of the VTA light rail system.

Services

Platform layout 
Bonaventura has a split platform with the northbound platform north of Bonaventura Drive and the southbound platform just to the south.

References

External links 

Santa Clara Valley Transportation Authority light rail stations
Railway stations in San Jose, California
1987 establishments in California
Railway stations in the United States opened in 1987